Maciel is a surname of Portuguese origin. Notable people with this surname include:

Alejandro Maciel (born 1997), Argentine footballer
Antonio Vicente Mendes Maciel or Antônio Conselheiro (1830–1897), Brazilian anti-slaver and insurrectionist priest
Badayco Maciel (born 1981), Paraguayan football manager and former player
Campinho Maciel (born 1986), Portuguese footballer
Carlos Maciel (born 1946), Paraguayan football referee
Cristhian Maciel (born 1992), Uruguayan footballer
Eduardo da Conceição Maciel (born 1986), Brazilian footballer
Emanuel Maciel (born 1997), Argentine footballer
Enrique Maciel (1897–1962), Argentine musician
Everson Maciel (born 1978), Brazilian footballer
Fabio Deivison Lopes Maciel (born 1980), Brazilian footballer
Francisco Maciel (disambiguation), several people
Frédéric Maciel (born 1994), Portuguese footballer
Jean Maciel (born 1989), Brazilian footballer
Jeferson Gusmao Maciel (born 1986), Brazilian footballer 
Jorge Maciel (born 1970), Spanish windsurfer
Larissa Maciel (born 1977), Brazilian actress
Leandro Maciel (born 1995), Argentine professional footballer
Leonel Maciel (born 1939), Mexican artist
Leonel Maciel (handballer) (born 1989), Argentine handball player
Maciel (footballer, born 2000) (born 2000), Brazilian football midfielder known mononymously as Maciel
Lucía Maciel (born ), Argentine actress
Manuel Maciel (born 1984), Paraguayan footballer
Marcial Maciel (1920–2008), Mexican founder of the Legionaries of Christ, a serial sexual abuser
 Sexual abuse cases of Marcial Maciel
María Mercedes Maciel Ortiz (born 1959), Mexican politician
Marco Maciel (1940–2021), Brazilian politician
Mateus Alves Maciel (born 1984), Brazilian footballer
Nilto Maciel (1945–2014), Brazilian writer
Otilia Villa Maciel (active 1951–1955), Argentine politician
Ozéia de Paula Maciel (born 1982), Brazilian football player
Rubens Charles Maciel (born 1979), Brazilian Jiu Jitsu (BJJ) competitor
Sergio Maciel (1965–2008), Argentine footballer
Thiago Maciel (born 1982), Brazilian footballer
Ubiratan Pereira Maciel (1944–2002), Brazilian basketball player
Yelena Maciel (born 1988), Venezuelan actress
Walter Maciel (born 1969), Los Angeles art dealer. Art Gallery, Walter Maciel Gallery

See also
Maciel (disambiguation)
 Maciel (footballer, born 1972) (Maciel Luiz Franco), Brazilian footballer
 Maciel (footballer, born 1978) (Maciel Lima Barbosa da Cunha), Brazilian footballer
 Maciel (footballer, born 2000) (Lucas Maciel Felix), Brazilian footballer

Portuguese-language surnames